Manic Impressions is the third studio album by the American thrash/progressive metal band Anacrusis. Manic Impressions was remastered and reissued in 1999.

Track listing
 "Paint a Picture" (Kenn Nardi) – 5:58 
 "I Love the World" (Robert Heaton, Justin Sullivan) – 4:49 (New Model Army cover) 
 "Something Real" (Nardi) – 5:59 
 "Dream Again" (Nardi, John Emery) – 3:20 
 "Explained Away" (Nardi, Emery, Kevin Heidbreder) – 6:01 
 "Still Black" (Nardi, Heidbreder) – 6:08 
 "What You Became" (Nardi) – 5:10 
 "Our Reunion" (Nardi, Heidbreder) – 4:53 
 "Idle Hours" (Nardi, Emery) – 4:36 
 "Far Too Long" (Nardi, Emery, Heidbreder) – 5:50

Personnel
Kenn Nardi – guitars and lead vocals 
Kevin Heidbreder – guitars 
John Emery – bass guitar
Chad Smith – drums

References

Anacrusis (band) albums
1991 albums
Albums free for download by copyright owner
Metal Blade Records albums